The white-eared night heron (Gorsachius magnificus) is a species of heron in the family Ardeidae. It is found in southern China and northern Vietnam. IN 2018, it has been also reported from Valmiki National Park, India. It is threatened by habitat loss and habitat fragmentation.

Taxonomy
The white-eared night heron was collected in Hainan by John Whitehead. It was described as Nycticorax magnifica by William Robert Ogilvie-Grant in 1899. The species is monotypic.

Distribution and habitat
This heron is found in southern China and northern Vietnam. By 2001, the species had only been recorded from about 20 localities; in the ten years from 2001 to 2011, surveys discovered it in more than 30 localities, making its known range much larger. Its natural habitat is subtropical or tropical forests and rivers. It has also been found in human-modified habitats.

Description
The male is mostly blackish-brown. The neck-sides are chestnut. The lores are yellow, and the beak is black. The eyes are yellow-orange. The head and nape are blackish. The postocular stripes and throat are white. The underparts are brown, with white streaks. The tarsi are green. The female is similar to the male, but its head and neck are less distinctly patterned. The female also has whitish streaks on its back and wings. The juvenile is similar to the female, but has a browner plumage and buff spots.

Behaviour and ecology
Like other night herons, this species is mostly nocturnal. It feeds on fish, shrimps and invertebrates. Its territorial call is a deep, raspy whoaa, lasting about 0.3 seconds and repeated every 5–15 seconds. Breeding has been recorded in both Vietnam and China. The clutch size is 3–5 eggs. In China, hatching has been observed in May, with an incubation period of about 25 days. In Vietnam, fledging has been observed in late April. Breeding seems to occur earlier in Vietnam than in China. The nest is in the shape of a circular tray. A study found that fledging occurred more than two months after hatching, longer than most other species of heron.

Status and conservation
The IUCN Red List has listed the white-eared night heron as an endangered species because its population is small, fragmented and declining. In the 1990s, the species was considered very rare and listed as a critically endangered species. It was downlisted to an endangered species in 2000. Its population is estimated at 250–999 mature individuals and 350–1500 total individuals. It is threatened by deforestation, hunting, overfishing and water pollution. It has been discovered in many new localities, but the population is probably declining because of the threats. The species is listed as a Class II protected species in China.

References

white-eared night heron
Birds of China
Birds of Vietnam
Birds of Hainan
Taxa named by William Robert Ogilvie-Grant
white-eared night heron
Taxonomy articles created by Polbot
Taxobox binomials not recognized by IUCN